Paul Gehlhaar (27 August 1905 in Königsberg - 2 July 1968) was a German international footballer. He was part of Germany's team at the 1928 Summer Olympics, but he did not play in any matches.

References

1905 births
1968 deaths
Sportspeople from Königsberg
Association football goalkeepers
German footballers
Germany international footballers
Olympic footballers of Germany
Footballers at the 1928 Summer Olympics
Hertha BSC players